Mochlus grandisonianus, also known as Lanza's writhing skink, is a species of skink. It is endemic to Somalia.

References

Mochlus
Skinks of Africa
Reptiles of Somalia
Endemic fauna of Somalia
Reptiles described in 1966
Taxa named by Benedetto Lanza
Taxa named by Salvatore Carfi